, nicknamed Buffy, is a trans-Neptunian object, classified as both a scattered disc object and a detached object, located in the outermost region of the Solar System. It was first observed on 11 December 2004, by astronomers with the Canada–France Ecliptic Plane Survey at the Mauna Kea Observatories, Hawaii, United States. It is the largest known highly inclined (> 45°) object. With a perihelion of 51 AU, it belongs to a small and poorly understood group of very distant objects with moderate eccentricities.

Discovery and naming 

 was discovered on 11 December 2004. It was discovered by astronomers led by (Rhiannon) Lynne Allen of the University of British Columbia as part of the Canada–France Ecliptic Plane Survey (CFEPS) using the Canada–France–Hawaii Telescope (CFHT) near the ecliptic. The team included Brett Gladman, John Kavelaars, Jean-Marc Petit, Joel Parker and Phil Nicholson. In 2015, six precovery images from 2002 and 2003 were found in Sloan Digital Sky Survey data.

The object was nicknamed "Buffy" by the discovery team, after the fictional vampire slayer Buffy Summers, and proposed several Inuit-based official names to the International Astronomical Union.

Orbit and classification 

 orbits the Sun at a distance of 51.1–63.4 AU once every 433 years and 3 months (158,242 days; semi-major axis of 57.26 AU). Its orbit has a moderate eccentricity of 0.11 and a high inclination of 47° with respect to the ecliptic.

Considered a scattered and detached object,  is particularly unusual as it has an unusually circular orbit for a scattered-disc object (SDO). Although it is thought that traditional scattered-disc objects have been ejected into their current orbits by gravitational interactions with Neptune, the low eccentricity of its orbit and the distance of its perihelion (SDOs generally have highly eccentric orbits and perihelia less than 38 AU) seems hard to reconcile with such celestial mechanics. This has led to some uncertainty as to the current theoretical understanding of the outer Solar System. The theories include close stellar passages, unseen planet/rogue planets/planetary embryos in the early Kuiper belt, and resonance interaction with an outward-migrating Neptune. The Kozai mechanism is capable of transferring orbital eccentricity to a higher inclination.

The object is the largest object with an inclination larger than 45°, traveling further "up and down" than "left to right" around the Sun when viewed edge-on along the ecliptic.

Most distant objects 

 came to aphelion around 1901. Other than long-period comets, it is currently about the thirteenth-most-distant known large body (57.5 AU) in the Solar System with a well-known orbit, after  and Dysnomia (96.3 AU), Gonggong (87.4 AU),  (85.9 AU),  (84.0 AU),  (83.3 AU),  (83.3 AU),  (80.3 AU),  (70.5 AU),  (60.3 AU),  (59.8 AU), and  (59.6 AU).

Physical characteristics 

With assumed albedos between 0.04 and 0.25, and absolute magnitudes from 4.3 to 4.6,  has an estimated diameter of 335 to 850 kilometers; the mean arrived at by considering the two single-figure estimates plus the centre points of the three ranges is 562 km, approximately a quarter the diameter of Pluto.

As of 2018, no well-documented spectral type and color indices, nor a rotational lightcurve have been obtained from spectroscopic and photometric observations; however, the Johnston's Archive lists a "taxonomic type" of "BR", and a "B-R magnitude" of 1.24. The rotation period, pole and shape officially remain unknown.

Gallery

See also 
 List of Solar System objects most distant from the Sun

Notes

References

External links 

 MPEC 2005-X72 : 2004 XR190, Minor Planet Electronic Circular, detailing discovery
 Discovery webpage by research team
 Canada-France-Hawaii Telescope Legacy Survey
 List Of Centaurs and Scattered-Disk Objects, Minor Planet Center
 
 

612911
612911
612911
20041211